Michael Herbert Rudolf Knatchbull, 5th Baron Brabourne,  (8 May 1895 – 23 February 1939) was a British peer and soldier, the son of the 4th Baron Brabourne.

Early life
Born on 8 May 1895 to Cecil Knatchbull-Hugessen, 4th Baron Brabourne, and his wife Helena Flesch von Brunningen (an Austrian noblewoman), as Michael Herbert Rudolf Knatchbull-Hugessen, he dropped the Hugessen part of his surname by deed poll in June 1919. Knatchbull was educated at Wellington College and the Royal Military Academy, Woolwich.

Military career

Knatchbull was commissioned as a second lieutenant in the Royal Artillery on 17 November 1914. He served in the Gallipoli Campaign from April 1915, attached to No. 3 Squadron, Royal Naval Air Service, flying artillery spotting missions, receiving promotion to lieutenant on 23 July. On 22 September 1915 he received a mention in despatches from General Ian Hamilton, Commander-in-Chief of the Mediterranean Expeditionary Force, and on 8 November was awarded the Military Cross for his "distinguished service in the Field during the operations at the Dardanelles."

Knatchbull was seconded to the staff to serve as an aide-de-camp on 8 June 1916, serving until 20 April 1918, when he was seconded to the Royal Air Force as a Staff Officer, 3rd Class. He was later promoted to the acting rank of captain, and then to acting major on 11 October 1918 when appointed Staff Officer, 2nd Class (Air). On 8 November 1918 he received a mention in despatches from Field Marshal Sir Douglas Haig.

After the end of the war, on 1 August 1919, he was granted a permanent commission in the RAF with the rank of lieutenant. However, he was placed on half-pay on 1 April 1920, and on 1 October was placed on the retired list on account of ill-health contracted on active service, with the rank of flight lieutenant.

House of Commons
Knatchbull was elected Conservative Member of Parliament (MP) for Ashford in 1931 and served as Parliamentary Private Secretary to Samuel Hoare, Secretary of State for India, from 1932 to 1933.

House of Lords
In 1933, upon his father's death, he succeeded as Baron Brabourne following which he was made Governor of Bombay and was invested as a Knight Grand Commander of the Order of the Indian Empire.

Governor of Bombay
While Governor of Bombay he laid the foundation stone at the historic Brabourne Stadium cricket ground in 1936 after conducting negotiations for the land with Anthony de Mello of the Cricket Club of India (CCI).

Governor of Bengal

In 1937 he also became a Knight Grand Commander of the Order of the Star of India and served as Governor of Bengal until 1939, the year he died.

Acting Viceroy of India
In June 1938, he was appointed as an Acting Viceroy of India. He served as the Viceroy for four months, as Lord Linlithgow (the then current Viceroy) had gone to England for a short vacation. Muhammad Ali Jinnah, the chairman of Indian religion-based political party All-India Muslim League, had a meeting with Brabourne on 16 August 1938 at his residence in Shimla. In the meeting, he requested Brabourne to accept him as the representative of all India's Muslims and in return he promised to support the British at the centre in Britain, but the Viceroy refused to do so. The Viceroy knew that if Jinnah is made the representative of Muslims, it would be a caution for the image of the British in the vision of other leaders. This angered Jinnah and he later declared Direct Action Day in 1946 to demand for Pakistan. Brabourne served as the Viceroy till 22 October 1938.

Family
On 22 January 1919, he married Lady Doreen Browne, youngest daughter of the 6th Marquess of Sligo, in St Peter's Church, Eaton Square. They had two children:

Norton Cecil Michael Knatchbull, 6th Baron Brabourne (1922–1943)
John Ulick Knatchbull, 7th Baron Brabourne (1924–2005). In 1946 he married Patricia Mountbatten (later 2nd Countess Mountbatten of Burma) and had issue.

His widow, The Dowager Lady Brabourne, was murdered in the 1979 bombing by the Provisional Irish Republican Army of The 1st Earl Mountbatten of Burma's boat. One of their grandsons also died in the bombing.

References

External links 
 
 

1890s births
1939 deaths
Royal Artillery officers
Royal Air Force officers
British Army personnel of World War I
Recipients of the Military Cross
5
Michael
Knights Grand Commander of the Order of the Star of India
Knights Grand Commander of the Order of the Indian Empire
Knatchbull, Michael
Knatchbull, Michael
UK MPs who inherited peerages
Governors of Bombay
British governors of Bengal
People educated at Wellington College, Berkshire
Graduates of the Royal Military Academy, Woolwich
Eldest sons of British hereditary barons
Royal Naval Air Service personnel of World War I
Royal Naval Air Service aviators
Royal Air Force personnel of World War I